Joan of France (4 May 1435 – 1482) was the seventh child and fourth daughter of Charles VII of France and Marie of Anjou. She married John II, Duke of Bourbon, in 1447. They had no children. She was the owner of the book of hours of Joan of France, now in the Bibliothèque nationale de France and classified as a national treasure of France.

Ancestry

1435 births
1482 deaths
French princesses
House of Valois
Duchesses of Bourbon
15th-century French people
15th-century French women
Daughters of kings